Dampierre-en-Crot is a commune in the Cher department in the Centre-Val de Loire region of France.

Geography

Population

Sights
 The church, dating from the 12th century.
 The restored late 17th-century auberge.
 Two old watermills.

See also
Communes of the Cher department

References

External links

 Dampierre-en-Crot on the IGN website
 Old inn website: cooking tips, anecdotes, old pictures and restoration stories
 The 17th-century Old Inn 

Communes of Cher (department)